Adele (French: Adèle; also Adela or Adélaïde/Aelis) (? — 1053) was a French noble lady and the countess suo jure of Bar-sur-Aube.

Life 
Lady Adele was a daughter of the count Nocher III of Bar-sur-Aube and his wife, whose name remains unknown. After the death of her father, Adele became a countess, since she was the eldest child of her parents. Her sister was named Isabella.

These are the husbands of lady Adele:
Renaud of Semur 
Renard of Joigny
Roger I of Vignory 
Ralph IV of Valois

Adele and her cousin Ralph IV—the son of Ralph III—were the parents of four children:
Walter of Bar-sur-Aube 
Simon de Crépy
Élisabeth
Adele of Valois

De jure uxoris, Ralph was the count of Bar-sur-Aube. Adele was a grandmother of Adelaide, Countess of Vermandois. Simon donated property to the abbey of Molesme for the soul of Adele.

Notes

Sources

Primary sources 
Acta Sanctorum — a chronicle in which the marriages of Adele are mentioned
Chronica Albrici Monachi Trium Fontium — by Alberic of Trois-Fontaines

French countesses
1053 deaths